Future Academies Watford is a co-educational secondary school and sixth form located in Garston, Watford, Hertfordshire, England.

History 
The school opened in 1954 as Francis Combe School, a secondary modern school. It was named after Francis Combe (or Combes), a Hemel Hempstead landowner who founded a charity school in Watford in 1651, with a bequest of £10 per annum.

It became the first comprehensive in Watford in 1966. Previously a community school administered by Hertfordshire County Council, in February 2008, the school was given permission to explore becoming an academy, sponsored by West Herts College and the University of Hertfordshire (later the Meller Educational Trust). The school reopened in September 2009 as Francis Combe Academy, specialising in English, art and media.

In 2020, the name was changed to Future Academies Watford when the school became part of the Future Academies multi-academy trust.

Facilities 
All of the school's buildings were rebuilt in 2012 except for the English and Maths block, which was built in 2001 (currently the Communications and Maths building). The £25 million rebuild, which connects to the older building, features three storeys and houses Science, ICT & Business and Humanities (originally Maths). The sports department includes a large sports hall, a dance studio and changing rooms. Two new outdoor spaces, the MUGA (multi use sports and games area) and the Agora. A new entrance foyer and a new art department focuses on open plan and collaborative working with no fixed walls between classrooms.

Notable former pupils 
Francis Combe School and Community College
 Bradley Walsh, comedian, television presenter, actor, singer, and former professional footballer
 Kelly Smith, professional footballer
 Mark Ilott, professional cricketer
 [Peter Urie]], television producer / director

References

External links 
 

Schools in Watford
Secondary schools in Hertfordshire
Academies in Hertfordshire
Educational institutions established in 1954
1954 establishments in England